Omucukia is a genus of spiders in the family Zodariidae. It was first described in 2008 by Koçak & Kemal. , it contains 2 species from Madagascar.

References

Zodariidae
Araneomorphae genera
Spiders of Madagascar